Chester City Hall and Opera House is a historic city hall and theatre located at Chester, Chester County, South Carolina. It was built in 1890–1891, and is a Romanesque Revival style brick building. The façade consists of three sections: a four-story tower, gabled three-story central section, and a less ornate three-story section. The interior was renovated following a fire in 1929, which destroyed the original spire tower containing a four-faced clock. Since 1891, this building has housed the town's administrative offices.

It was listed on the National Register of Historic Places in 1973.

References

City and town halls on the National Register of Historic Places in South Carolina
Government buildings completed in 1891
Romanesque Revival architecture in South Carolina
Buildings and structures in Chester County, South Carolina
National Register of Historic Places in Chester County, South Carolina
City and town halls in South Carolina
Opera houses in South Carolina
Theatres on the National Register of Historic Places in South Carolina